The Conspiracy in Genoa is a 1921 German silent historical drama film directed by Paul Leni and starring Wilhelm Diegelmann, Maria Fein and Fritz Kortner. It is an adaptation of the 1783 play Fiesco by Friedrich Schiller.

It premiered at the Ufa-Palast am Zoo.

Cast
 Wilhelm Diegelmann as Andrea Doria, Doge von Genua
 Maria Fein as Gräfin Julia Imperiali
 Fritz Kortner as Gianettino
 Hans Mierendorff as Fiesco
 Erna Morena as Leonore
 Ilka Grüning as Matrone
 Magnus Stifter as Verrino
 Lewis Brody as Mulay Hassan
 Hellmuth Bergmann as Bourgorgnino
 Louis Krieger as Zibo
 Bernhard Goetzke as Calcagno
 Max Gülstorff as Lomellino
 Fritz Beckmann as Alte seidenhändler
 Lydia Potechina as Bertha
 Lia Eibenschütz
 Paul Günther
 Ludwig Rex
 William Dieterle

References

Bibliography
 Grange, William. Cultural Chronicle of the Weimar Republic. Scarecrow Press, 2008.

External links

1921 films
1920s German-language films
1920s historical drama films
Films of the Weimar Republic
German silent feature films
German historical drama films
Films directed by Paul Leni
Films set in Genoa
Films set in the 1540s
German films based on plays
Films based on works by Friedrich Schiller
UFA GmbH films
German black-and-white films
1921 drama films
Silent historical drama films
1920s German films